Joshua Jones is an American media executive in the Dallas–Fort Worth market. He oversees two radio stations for Metro Broadcasters, Inc., and owns half of (and operates) a record-label with his promotional partner Shiner Bock. Jones is also a consultant for businesses trying to use music to brand themselves and for artists trying to introduce their music to larger audiences.

Biography

Early life and education

Jones earned a bachelor's degree from Hardin–Simmons University in 1996. He earned a master's in media studies from the University of North Texas in 2009.

Career
Jones is often credited as a pioneer in the Texas/Americana music scene. One of the stations he oversees, KHYI, became on January 1, 1997 the first 24-hour commercial Americana radio station in the United States. In an effort to lure male listeners back to country radio, KHYbegan shunning the "…flat-belly, pretty boy, disco country music" that targeted a female demographic and dominated country radio at the time.

He is featured in the documentary The Range, a film by Dean Augustin.

References

Year of birth missing (living people)
Living people
American radio executives
Hardin–Simmons University alumni
University of North Texas alumni